Szilárd Bokros (born 28 March 2000) is a Hungarian professional footballer who plays for Diósgyőr.

Club career
On 28 June 2021, Bokros joined Diósgyőr on a season-long loan. On 4 July 2022, he moved to Diósgyőr on a permanent basis.

Club statistics

Updated to games played as of 19 May 2019.

References

External links

2000 births
People from Kistarcsa
Sportspeople from Pest County
Living people
Hungarian footballers
Hungary youth international footballers
Association football midfielders
Csákvári TK players
Puskás Akadémia FC players
Puskás Akadémia FC II players
Diósgyőri VTK players
Nemzeti Bajnokság I players
Nemzeti Bajnokság II players
Nemzeti Bajnokság III players